is a Japanese airline based in Tokyo Heliport, Shin-Kiba, Tokyo. Their fleet consists mostly of helicopters and operate regular passenger services within the Izu Islands. Toho Air Service also provides helicopters in mountain rescue or for private purposes.

Overview and operations
The airline was founded in 1960 as Mitsuya Airlines. The name was changed to the current name in 1967.

On behalf of the Tokyo Metropolitan Islands Promotion Corporation, Toho Air Service has operated the "Tokyo Ai-Land Shuttle" since 1993, a regular helicopter service in the Izu Islands. This is the regular helicopter service in Japan. The islands served include Ōshima, To-shima, Miyake-jima, Mikura-jima, Hachijō-jima, and Aogashima. Since 2018, citizens of the Izu Islands are eligible for an "islander discount". As of March 2019, the airline has carried over 400,000 passengers.

Fleet

Toho Air Service operates both helicopters and aircraft for various purposes.

Aérospatiale Alouette III
Aérospatiale Dauphin 2
Aérospatiale Écureuil 2
Aérospatiale Écureuil
Aérospatiale Super Puma
Cessna 172 Skyhawk
Eurocopter EC135
Eurocopter EC155
Sikorsky S-76

References

Helicopter airlines
Airlines established in 1960
Japanese brands
1960 establishments in Japan
Airline companies based in Tokyo